Fatal Abyss is an action game developed by The Human Software Co. and published by SegaSoft for Microsoft Windows in 1998.

Reception

The game received mixed reviews according to the review aggregation website GameRankings.

References

External links
 

1998 video games
Action video games
Multiplayer and single-player video games
North America-exclusive video games
Sega video games
Video games developed in Hungary
Windows games
Windows-only games